José Carlos Altuve (born May 6, 1990) is a Venezuelan professional baseball second baseman for the Houston Astros of Major League Baseball (MLB). The Astros signed Altuve as an amateur free agent in 2007, and he made his major league debut in 2011. From 2014 to 2017, Altuve recorded at least 200 hits each season and led the American League (AL) in the category. He won three batting championships in that span.

An eight-time MLB All-Star, Altuve has been voted the starting second baseman for the AL in the All-Star Game five times; his eight selections with the Astros is a club record. In 2017, he won the AL Most Valuable Player Award, the Hank Aaron Award, and became a World Series champion with the Astros, each for the first time.  In the same year, Altuve was Sports Illustrated co-Sportsperson of the Year with J. J. Watt of the NFL's Houston Texans for helping to lead relief efforts in the aftermath of Hurricane Harvey.  Other awards Altuve received in 2017 were the Associated Press Male Athlete of the Year, The Sporting News Major League Player of the Year (making him the fifth player to be selected in consecutive years), and Baseball America Major League Player of the Year.  He has also won six Silver Slugger Awards (an American League record) and one Rawlings Gold Glove. After hitting a walk-off home run to win the 2019 American League Championship Series, Altuve was awarded his first ALCS MVP.

In 2014, he became the first player in over 80 years to reach 130 hits and 40 stolen bases before the All-Star Game. That same season, he became the first Astro to win a batting title, leading the AL with a .341 average.  He has twice led the AL in stolen bases. From Maracay, Venezuela, Altuve played for the Venezuelan national team in the 2017 World Baseball Classic (WBC). Altuve's 23 home runs are the second-most all-time in postseason history after Manny Ramirez, and first among infielders, with Altuve being the fastest to do so in games played. He had 31 games with four hits from 2011 to 2021, the most among any player in that span in MLB, and he also has the most 3+ hit games in MLB since 2011 with over 160. As part of an era that has seen the Astros win two World Series titles and four pennants in six seasons, Altuve is widely regarded as one of the greatest Astros in franchise history, and one of the best second basemen of his generation.

Early life
Altuve is a native of Maracay, Venezuela, and grew up there.  At age seven, he met fellow future major leaguer Salvador Pérez, who became a catcher for the Kansas City Royals.  The two competed together beginning in Maracay and many times in American League games.

Professional career

Minor leagues
At age 16, Altuve attended a Houston Astros tryout camp in Maracay.  However, the team's scouts declined to allow him to participate because they decided he was too short and they suspected that he had lied about his age.  The next day, with encouragement from his father, Altuve returned to the camp and produced his birth certificate.  Al Pedrique, then a special assistant for the Astros, asked Altuve, "Can you play?"  Altuve looked him in the eye and said, "I'll show you."  Pedrique championed him to the front office, convincing them that he had the talent and strength to eventually play in the major leagues.  The club gave him an evaluation, and, after he impressed team officials, they signed him to a contract as an undrafted free agent on March 6, 2007, with a $15,000 (USD, $ today) bonus.

After a strong 2007 season in the Venezuelan Summer League in which he hit .343, Altuve moved to the United States in 2008 and hit .284 in 40 games for the Greeneville Astros in the Rookie-level Appalachian League. He returned to Greeneville in 2009 and hit .324 with 21 stolen bases in just 45 games, earning him a spot on the league All-Star team, team most valuable player (MVP) honors, and a promotion to the Tri-City ValleyCats of the Class A-Short Season New York-Penn League for which he played in 21 games. He began 2010 with the Lexington Legends of the Class A South Atlantic League, hitting .308 with 39 steals and 11 home runs, earned a spot on the league all-star team, and then moved up to the Lancaster JetHawks in the Class A-Advanced California League and hit .276.

Returning to Lancaster for 2011, he hit .408 with 19 steals in 52 games. After being promoted to the Corpus Christi Hooks of the Class AA Texas League, he hit .361, giving him an overall line of .389 with 24 steals, 26 walks, and 40 strikeouts in 357 minor league at-bats that year. He was named the second baseman on Baseball Americas 2011 Minor League All Star Team as well as the Houston Astros Minor League Player of the Year. Altuve was called up to the major league club in mid-summer, bypassing Class AAA level.

Houston Astros

2011

The Astros promoted Altuve to the major leagues for the first time on July 19, 2011. He represented the Astros at the 2011 All-Star Futures Game. He was named the second baseman on Baseball America 2011 Minor League All-Star team. On July 27, 2011, Altuve tied Russ Johnson for the Astros record for most consecutive games with a hit to start a career with 7.
On August 20, 2011, Altuve hit an inside-the-park home run, his first major league home-run. He became the first Astros player since Adam Everett in 2003 to hit an inside-the-park home run, the first Astros player to get his first major league home run on an inside-the-park home run since pitcher Butch Henry in 1992, and the first Astros player to lead off a game with an inside-the-park home run since Bill Doran in 1987. He batted .346 over his first 21 games before slumping a bit and ended the year with a .276 average. He also hit two home runs, stole seven bases, and posted a .358 slugging percentage in 221 at-bats.

Altuve returned to Venezuela to play for Navegantes del Magallanes, based in Valencia, Carabobo, in the Venezuelan Winter League. He hit .339 with a .381 on-base percentage and a .455 slugging percentage. Altuve finished 2011 with 898 aggregated plate appearances, including 391 in the minors, 234 with Houston, and 273 with the Magallanes. Altuve had 82 hits in winter league, bringing his cumulative year-end count to 282.

2012
The  height difference is believed to be the biggest between pitcher and batter with the exception of a 1951 publicity stunt in which a  Eddie Gaedel had one plate appearance for the St. Louis Browns. Altuve was the Astros' representative at the All-Star Game, played at Kauffman Stadium in Kansas City, Missouri. This was his first career selection.

2013
On July 13, 2013, Altuve signed a four-year, $12.5 million extension that included two club options for 2018 and 2019 worth $6 and $6.5 million, respectively. The deal also included a $750,000 bonus to be received in 2013. At the time of the extension, Altuve was hitting .280 with 21 stolen bases, 15 doubles, and 28 RBI.

2014

On June 29, 2014, Altuve stole two bases in a game against the Detroit Tigers. This made him the first MLB player since Ray Chapman in 1917 to steal two or more bases in four consecutive games. Altuve became the first MLB player since 1933 to have 130 hits and 40 stolen bases before the All-Star Break. Altuve was named to the 2014 All-Star Game. Coupled with his 2012 All-Star appearance in the Astros' final season as a National League team, Altuve is the only player in Major League history to represent both the American and National Leagues in the All-Star Game while still being a member of the same team.

On September 16, Altuve hit a single up the middle to break Craig Biggio's franchise single-season hit record of 210 hits. The Astros had 11 games remaining in the season at the time that Altuve broke the record. In 158 games, Altuve totaled 225 hits and a .341 batting average, both of which led the major leagues, and 56 stolen bases, which led the American League. He also hit 47 doubles, seven home runs, and 59 RBI. He became the first Astros player to win a batting title.

After the 2014 season, Altuve traveled to Japan to participate in the 2014 Major League Baseball Japan All-Star Series. He was named the GIBBY/This Year in Baseball Award winner as the Breakout Everyday Player of the Year. He won the first Silver Slugger Award of his career, as the top hitter among American League second basemen. He was also bestowed his first iteration of the Luis Aparicio Award, annually given to the Venezuelan judged to produce the best individual performance.

2015
Altuve was voted as the AL's starting second baseman for the MLB All-Star Game, edging Kansas City's Omar Infante by more than 600,000 votes. Altuve became the third Astro second baseman to be voted a starter, following Biggio and Jeff Kent.

On September 11, 2015, Altuve recorded his 800th career hit, surpassing Biggio for the fastest Astro player to reach 800 hits. In the final game of the season, Altuve went 3-for-5 to reach 200 hits for the second season in a row, which led the American League, while becoming both the first player in Astros history and Venezuelan to accumulate multiple 200-hit seasons. He also led the AL in stolen bases (38), and his .313 batting average was third best in the majors. He reached then-career highs with each of 15 home runs, .459 SLG, 86 runs scored, and 66 RBI. He led American League second basemen in fielding percentage (.993).

The Astros clinched a playoff berth on the final day of the season, securing their place in the AL Wild Card Game versus the New York Yankees. Thus, Altuve made the MLB playoffs for the first time in his career. The Astros defeated the Yankees, 3−0. Altuve drove in Jonathan Villar in the seventh inning versus Yankee reliever Dellin Betances for the final run of the contest. Next, the Astros faced the Royals in the American League Division Series (ALDS), but were eliminated in five games.

Altuve was awarded his first career Rawlings Gold Glove Award for second base on November 10, 2015. He also received his second consecutive Silver Slugger Award.

2016
For his performance in the month of June 2016, Altuve was named AL Player of the Month for the first time in his career. He had batted .420, six doubles, four home runs, 15 RBI, six stolen bases and 1.112 OPS (.492 OBP/.620 SLG) in 26 games. He became an All-Star selection for the fourth time of his career, and started for the second consecutive time.

On August 16, Altuve collected his 1,000th hit, setting the Astros' franchise record for fewest games to do so (786) after a three-hit night versus the St. Louis Cardinals.  He also was the second-fastest among active players to do so, following Ichiro Suzuki (696 games).

In 161 games, Altuve had an MLB-leading 216 hits, an AL-leading .338 batting average, 30 stolen bases. He also found a power surge with 42 doubles (the second most of his career and his third straight season with 40+ doubles), a career-high 24 home runs, and a career-high 96 RBI. This marked his second batting title, the last being in 2014.

At the end of the season, Altuve was named The Sporting News Player of the Year, and the MLBPA Players Choice Awards for Major League Player of the Year, AL Outstanding Player, and Majestic Athletic Always Game Award. He placed third in the AL MVP voting, behind winner Mike Trout and Mookie Betts.

2017

Voted as a starter in the All-Star Game at Marlins Park in Miami, Altuve batted leadoff and played second base.  He served as the Astros' number three hitter during the 2017 season.  Over two games versus the Baltimore Orioles and Philadelphia Phillies on July 23–24, he set the club record for hits in consecutive plate appearances with eight.

In July, Altuve hit .485 for the fifth-highest average in one month since 1961. Over 23 games, he accumulated 48 hits, 10 doubles, one triple, four home runs, 21 RBI, and 1.251 OPS. He carried a 19-game hitting streak from July 2 to 23. He also recorded five consecutive multi-hit games during the week of July 3–9, becoming the ninth player in MLB history to do so. His average set the Astros record for one calendar month—surpassing Richard Hidalgo's .476 average in September of 2000—and he won his second AL Player of the Month Award.

Altuve concluded the 2017 campaign by playing in 153 contests with an MLB-leading and career-best .346 batting average, an AL-leading 204 hits, a major-league leading 30 infield hits, 39 doubles, 32 stolen bases, 24 home runs, and 84 RBI. He led all MLB hitters (140 or more plate appearances) in batting average against right-handers, at .344. The Astros finished with a 101−61 record, clinching the AL West division. Altuve became just the fifth hitter since integration in 1947 to record four straight 200-hit seasons, following Wade Boggs (1983−89), Kirby Puckett (1986−89), Suzuki (2001−2010), and Michael Young (2003−07). He also became the first hitter in Major League history to solely lead his respective league in hits for four years in a row while also collecting his third career batting title.  Altuve led MLB in Wins Above Replacement (WAR, 8.3) for the first time in his career. He also led the American League in power-speed number (27.4). On September 19, he was announced as the recipient of MLB's Lou Gehrig Memorial Award for 2017, as the player "who best exemplifies the giving character" of Gehrig. With 1,250 career hits at the end of 2017, only Ty Cobb, Hank Aaron, and Pete Rose had accumulated more hits through their age-27 season.

In Game 1 of the ALDS against the Boston Red Sox, Altuve hit three home runs in a single game for the first time of his career while becoming the tenth player to hit three home runs in a single postseason game. The Astros faced the New York Yankees in the American League Championship Series (ALCS). After taking the first two games in Houston, with Altuve scoring the winning run in Game 2, Altuve and the Astros offense slumped as they lost all three middle games at Yankee Stadium. He hit a solo home run in a 4−0, Game 7 win in which the Astros advanced to their second World Series in franchise history, to face the National League pennant-winning Los Angeles Dodgers.

In Game 2 of the World Series, Altuve, along with two Astros teammates–Carlos Correa and George Springer—and two Dodgers players–Charlie Culberson and Yasiel Puig—all homered in extra innings as the Astros prevailed, 7−6. The five home runs accounted for the most hit in extra innings of any single game in major league history. Altuve homered in the bottom of the fifth inning of Game 5, tying the score 7–7, and hit a game-tying double in the eighth, before the Astros prevailed 13–12 in the bottom of the 10th inning with a walk-off single from Alex Bregman. The World Series went on for seven games, and the Astros prevailed for the first title in franchise history.

In the Astros' 18-game championship run, Altuve batted .310/.388/.634, 22 hits, 14 runs scored, seven home runs, 14 RBI, and nine extra-base hits.  He established a franchise record for total hits in a postseason.  Further, he tied the record for home runs by a second baseman in a single postseason, and hit the fourth-most among all players.  Along with pitcher Justin Verlander, Altuve was named winner of the Babe Ruth Award as MVP of the 2017 postseason.

Prior to Game 2 of the World Series, Altuve was presented with the Hank Aaron Award, the first of his career, as the "most outstanding offensive performer" in the American League. It was the first time a Houston Astros player had won the prize. Next, he was named The Sporting News Major League Player of the Year for the second consecutive season, following Ted Williams (1941−42), Joe Morgan (1975−76), Albert Pujols (2008−09), and Miguel Cabrera (2012−13) as repeat winners in consecutive years of the honor given out since 1936. Other awards Altuve received in 2017 included Baseball America'''s Major League Player of the Year award, becoming the first Venezuelan since Johan Santana in 2006 to receive the award bestowed since 1998. He was also the first second baseman and first Astro ever to win it.  For the second consecutive season, he won the Players Choice Awards for Major League Player of the Year and AL Outstanding Player.  He won his fourth consecutive and overall Silver Slugger Award at second base.

The Astros selected Altuve's option for 2018, worth a reported $6 million, on November 3, 2017. On November 16, Altuve was conferred the AL Most Valuable Player Award, only the second Astro to win the award, following Jeff Bagwell in 1994.  Altuve became the tenth second baseman to be granted MVP, and was the shortest player to win since Phil Rizzuto, also 5' 6", in 1950. Altuve became the first player since Buster Posey in 2012—and the eighth player overall—to win a batting title, regular season MVP, and World Series in the same season.  On December 5, Altuve and Houston Texans defensive end J. J. Watt were named co-winners of the Sports Illustrated Sportsperson of the Year Award for Altuve's efforts in leading the Astros to their first World Series title while he and Watts aided in the recovery of the Greater Houston area in the aftermath of Hurricane Harvey.  Altuve became the 18th Major League Baseball player to win the award in its 64-year history, and both the first Houston Astro and first Venezuelan player.  He was also selected the 2017 Associated Press Male Athlete of the Year.

In 2019, Altuve's role in the 2017 World Series gained nationwide attention in the Houston Astros sign stealing scandal. With regard to the scandal, Altuve said, "I'm not going to say to you that it was good — it was wrong. We feel bad, we feel remorse, like I said, the impact on the fans, the impact on the game — we feel bad." According to the website signstealingscandal.com, Altuve's instances of hearing the trash can banging were significantly lower than those of any other everyday player. Peter Gammons noted in 2022 that when he talked to Altuve in 2020 about how players, coaches, and members in the organization believed that Altuve did not participate in the stealing, Altuve declined to talk about it. He stated that it would be a "betrayal of my teammates" to discuss the matter and asked that Gammons not write about it. Despite this, many Astros players have defended Altuve in particular of any wrongdoing. Carlos Correa, in an interview with Ken Rosenthal, stated of Altuve's role in the scandal: "The few times that the trash can was banged was without his consent, and he would go inside the clubhouse and inside the dugout to whoever was banging the trash can and he would get pissed. He would get mad. He would say, 'I don't want this. I can't hit like this. Don't you do that to me.' He played the game clean"; Correa's comments came after Dodgers outfielder Cody Bellinger accused Altuve of stealing the MVP Award from runner-up Aaron Judge.

2018
Prior to the 2018 season, Sports Illustrated'' ranked Altuve as the #2 player in baseball, trailing only Trout.  On March 16, 2018, Altuve and the Astros agreed to a five-year, $151 million contract extension that would span the 2020–24 seasons.  His current contract included a $6 million salary in 2018 and a $6.5 million team option in 2019.  It was the largest contract in team history, and he became the sixth player to agree to a contract with an average annual value of $30 million per season or greater.

Altuve reached 1,000 games played in his career on April 17, 2018, versus the Seattle Mariners.  He became the 20th player to appear in 1,000 games for the Astros.  Over three games versus the Cleveland Indians spanning May 25–27, he realized a base hit in each of 10 consecutive at bats, breaking his own club record of eight which he had set the year prior.  The streak included three doubles, one triple, and one home run.

On July 8, 2018, Altuve was selected as the starting second baseman for the American League in the All-Star Game, collecting the most votes of any player with 4,849,630 votes. It was his 6th All-Star selection overall and his 5th consecutive appearance and 4th straight start. On July 29, Altuve was placed on the disabled list for the first time in his MLB career due to right knee discomfort. Plagued with a right knee injury, the Astros announced that Altuve would serve as the designated hitter for the remainder of the season. In 137 games, Altuve finished with a .316 average, 13 home runs, and 61 RBI.

With the Astros finishing the year 103-59, the team clinched the AL West again, sweeping the Cleveland Indians in 3 games before eventually falling to the Red Sox in the ALCS. On October 19, 2018, Altuve officially underwent surgery to repair a patella avulsion fracture in his right knee. On November 8, Altuve was awarded his fifth career Silver Slugger Award and his fifth consecutive award. Having won his fifth award at second base, it tied him with Robinson Canó for most awards for an American League second baseman and second most all-time behind Ryne Sandberg.

2019
On April 9, 2019, Altuve hit his 100th career home run off New York Yankees pitcher Jonathan Loáisiga.  He became the 16th player in Astros history to reach 100 home runs.  On April 12, Altuve connected for his second career grand slam, and first since 2014, in a 10–6 win over the Seattle Mariners.  Altuve would hit another home run off of Félix Hernández the next night, making it the fifth consecutive game with a home run and sixth home run in that span.  Altuve was the first Astro to hit a home run in five consecutive games since Morgan Ensberg's franchise-record six consecutive games in 2006.

Altuve was placed on the injured list on May 12 with a left hamstring strain, missing 35 games until returning versus the Cincinnati Reds on June 19.  At the time, he had hit nine home runs, though his overall batting line was down from his career norm, at .243/.329/.472 (117 wRC+).

On July 2, 2019, Altuve doubled in the top of the seventh for his third of four hits in a 9–8 victory over the Colorado Rockies.  His 142nd career three-hit game, Altuve passed Jeff Bagwell for second-most in Astros history, behind Craig Biggio (225).  It was also Altuve's second straight game with at least three hits, a 6–1 victory over the Seattle Mariners on June 30.  He hit his third career grand slam and second of the season on July 14, yielding the Astros a franchise record-breaking ninth grand slam in a single season.

During a contest versus the St. Louis Cardinals on July 28, Altuve homered off Dakota Hudson for his 1,500th career hit, one of three hits in a 6–2 win that afternoon, in his 1,190th career game.  The only players in the divisional play era to reach the milestone faster were Suzuki, Wade Boggs, Kirby Puckett, Nomar Garciaparra, Tony Gwynn and Derek Jeter.

Altuve finished the regular season batting .298/.353/.550 with 31 home runs and 74 RBIs in 500 at bats.

Altuve continued his hot hitting in October. During the ALDS Altuve hit 3 home runs en route to a 3–2 series victory over the Tampa Bay Rays. With his 3rd home run of the series in Game 5, Altuve hit his 11th career postseason home run, the most by any second baseman in baseball history and drew him into a tie with George Springer for most postseason home runs by a Houston Astros player. In the ALCS, the Astros prevailed due to Altuve. In Game 6, with the game tied in the ninth inning, he hit a deep shot off Aroldis Chapman to send Houston to the World Series for the second time in three seasons. It was the fifth walkoff home run to end an LCS in MLB history. Altuve received the ALCS MVP award for his performance in the series, batting .348 with 2 home runs, 3 RBIs, 6 runs scored, and a 1.097 OPS. He also set the record for the most career postseason homers by a second baseman (13). He hit .303 with no home runs and one RBI in the 2019 World Series, which the Astros lost to the Washington Nationals.

2020
In 2020, he batted .219/.286/.344 with 5 home runs and 18 RBI in 192 at bats. On July 27, 2020, Altuve hit his 300th double in his MLB career. On October 7, 2020, Altuve became the Venezuelan with the most home runs in postseason history; he is tied with Mickey Mantle and Reggie Jackson for 5th-most home runs in postseason history. In Game 4 of the ALCS, Altuve took a  four-seam fastball from Tampa Bay Rays starter Tyler Glasnow and hit the fastest pitches hit for home runs in 2020. On October 15, 2020, Altuve became the Venezuelan with the most RBI in the playoffs.

In the postseason, he batted .306/.378/.565 with 5 home runs and 11 RBI in 48 at bats.

2021
On June 15, 2021, Altuve hit a walk-off grand slam versus the Texas Rangers.  The next day, he continued with a lead-off home run against Texas; Altuve is the first player in major league history to have hit a walk-off grand slam and then hit a lead-off home run in the following game.  On June 23, Altuve hit his 150th career home run, doing so off Thomas Eshelman of the Baltimore Orioles.

On July 4, 2021, after finishing as the runner-up AL second baseman in fan voting, Altuve was named to his seventh All-Star Game, tying the Astros franchise record with Craig Biggio for the most career All-Star game selections.

On September 17, 2021, Altuve hit a home run off Madison Bumgarner of the Arizona Diamondbacks at Minute Maid Park to collect his 849th career hit in the stadium, which tied him with Lance Berkman for most hits by an Astro in the venue. He then passed Berkman the next night with a double.

In Game 6 of the 2021 World Series, Altuve made his 73rd postseason start as part of the infield unit of Alex Bregman, Carlos Correa, and Yuli Gurriel, which was more postseason starts than any quartet of teammates in major league history, surpassing the Yankees' Derek Jeter, Tino Martinez, Paul O’Neill, and Bernie Williams, who had started 68 postseason contests together. In 77 total plate appearances during the 2021 playoffs, Altuve tied the record held by Carlos Beltran for most runs scored in one postseason with 21 runs.

2022
On May 19, 2022, Altuve doubled for the 344th time in his career, which broke a tie with César Cedeño for fourth-most in Astros history.  He also reached a season-high four hits to drive a 5–1 win over the Rangers.  On June 23 versus the Yankees, he reached base four times, collecting three hits including two doubles in a 7–6 loss.  Altuve appeared in his 1,500th career game on July 3, 2022, in a contest versus the Los Angeles Angels, going 3-for-5.

On July 8, Altuve was named the starter at second base for the American League in the MLB All-Star Game.  It was his eighth selection overall, and fifth as a starter, both setting franchise records.  He led AL second basemen in on-base percentage (.368), slugging percentage (.539) OPS (.907) and home runs (17).  Craig Biggio (seven) previously held the record for most appearances.

On August 3, he went 4-for-4 against the Boston Red Sox, which tied his career high and tied him with Biggio for most four-hit games in team history (34).  Altuve was named the Astros' Heart & Hustle Award winner on August 5, making him a nominee for the major league award in November.  Altuve doubled twice, walked twice, scored twice and drove in two runs lead a 5–3 win over Texas on August 31.  Altuve was 3-for-4 with a home run, double, and three RBI on September 4 versus the Angels, leading to a 9–1 win.  On September 11 versus the Angels, Altuve achieved his 12th three-hit game of the season.  Altuve's leadoff home run on September 19 versus the Rays started the Astros' scoring in a 4–0 win to the clinch a fifth AL West division title over the previous six seasons.  On September 27, Altuve hit a leadoff home run against the Arizona Diamondbacks.  It was his twelfth leadoff home run this season, tying the Astros' team record set by George Springer in 2019.

For the 2022 regular season, Altuve batted .300, reaching the mark for the first time since 2018, and tied his career high with 66 walks in 141 games.  He finished eighth in the AL in batting, fourth in each of OBP (.387), SLG (.533) and OPS (.921), and third in OPS+ (160).  He also ranked second both with 103 runs scored and stolen base percentage (94.74, 18-for-19), eighth in doubles (39), and tenth in total bases (281).  He led the Astros in runs scored and base hits (158).  Altuve won his fourth Luis Aparicio Award, and was nominated for the AL Hank Aaron Award.

Altuve endured an 0-for-16 performance in an ALDS sweep of the Mariners, including a career-worst 0-for-8 in third game which lasted a postseason record-tying 18 innings.  The hitless streak extended to 25 at bats, setting a record for most to start a postseason, until Altuve hit an opposite-field double in the fifth inning at Yankee Stadium in Game 3 of the 2022 ALCS. The Astros advanced to the World Series and defeated the Philadelphia Phillies in six games to give Altuve his second World Series title; Altuve went 8-for-26 in the series.

Following the season's conclusion, Altuve won his sixth Silver Slugger Award and first since 2018. He also finished fifth in votes for the American League MVP Award, the highest since he won the award.

International career
Altuve represents his native Venezuela in international competition. He participated in the 2017 World Baseball Classic, splitting time at second and third base with Rougned Odor. This decision led to criticism of Venezuela manager Omar Vizquel, due to the fact that neither Altuve nor Odor had ever played third base in the majors before; both players made errors at critical moments in the second round, which eventually led to Venezuela's early exit from the tournament. Vizquel defended his managerial decisions, stating: "There's nothing we can do about it. We are trying to put the players there that got the opportunity to get some runs for us [...] It's hard for one guy to get in the lineup sometimes. I can't really bench Altuve and Odor." In Venezuela's 2017 campaign, Altuve slashed .259/.286/.259 with seven hits and one RBI.

On August 17, 2022, Altuve announced that he would again play for Venezuela in the 2023 World Baseball Classic.

Awards

Personal life

Inspired by broadcasters debating how many "Altuves" a particular home run traveled, Bryan Trostel created a simple web-based calculator to calculate distance in Official Standard Listed Altuves (OSLA). Although Altuve's listed height is 5 feet 6 inches (5.5 feet), one OSLA = 5.417 feet (5 feet 5 inches). Altuve himself has been receptive of the idea, saying "It's funny, man... When they told me how many 'Altuves' was a home run, I just laughed."

On November 1, 2016, Altuve's wife Nina gave birth to their first child, a daughter. They reside in Pearland, Texas.

Altuve has cited fellow Venezuelan designated hitter and catcher Víctor Martínez as a mentor.

Altuve is a born-again Christian and has spoken about his faith in videos released by the Astros for faith day events.

See also

 Houston Astros award winners and league leaders
 List of Houston Astros team records
 List of Major League Baseball career assists as a second baseman leaders
 List of Major League Baseball career games played as a second baseman leaders
 List of Major League Baseball hit records
 List of Major League Baseball players from Venezuela
 Major League Baseball titles leaders

References
Footnotes

Sources

External links

 

1990 births
Living people
American League All-Stars
American League batting champions
American League Championship Series MVPs
American League Most Valuable Player Award winners
American League stolen base champions
Corpus Christi Hooks players
Fresno Grizzlies players
Gold Glove Award winners
Greeneville Astros players
Houston Astros players
Lancaster JetHawks players
Lexington Legends players
Luis Aparicio Award winners
Major League Baseball players from Venezuela
Major League Baseball second basemen
National League All-Stars
Navegantes del Magallanes players
People from Puerto Cabello
Round Rock Express players
Sportspeople from Maracay
Silver Slugger Award winners
Sugar Land Space Cowboys players
Tri-City ValleyCats players
Venezuelan Christians
Venezuelan expatriate baseball players in the United States
Venezuelan Summer League Astros players
World Baseball Classic players of Venezuela
2017 World Baseball Classic players
2023 World Baseball Classic players